Kovačići (Cyrillic: Ковачићи) may refer to several villages in Bosnia and Herzegovina:

Kovačići, Kalinovik
Kovačići (Kladanj)
Kovačići, Nevesinje
Kovačići, Novi Travnik
Kovačići, Olovo
Kovačići, Zenica

See also
Kovač (disambiguation)
Kovači (disambiguation)
Kovačić (disambiguation)
Kovačica (disambiguation)
Kovačice, a village
Kovačina, a village
Kovačevo (disambiguation)
Kovačevac (disambiguation)
Kovačevci (disambiguation)
Kovačevići (disambiguation)
Kováčová (disambiguation)
Kováčovce, a village